Debus is a French name in origin. It is commonly used as a surname. Notable people with the surname include:

 Allen G. Debus (1926–2009), American historian of science
 Bob Debus (born 1943), Australian politician
 Jon Debus (born 1958), player, coach and manager in Minor League Baseball
 Kurt H. Debus (1908–1983), NASA official
 Bob Debus (born 1943), famous engineer

See also
 Debus (crater), a crater on the far side of the moon named for Kurt Debus

Surnames from given names